Anationalism is a term originating from the community of Esperanto speakers. It denotes a range of cosmopolitan political concepts that combine some or all of the following tendencies and ideas:
radical antinationalism,
universalism,
"one-world-ism",
acceptance of the historic trend toward linguistic homogenization on a world scale, and in some cases even a striving to accelerate that trend,
the necessity of political education and organization of the world proletariat in accordance with those ideas, and
the utility of Esperanto as an instrument of such political education.

Although conceived within the World Anational Association (SAT, Sennacieca Asocio Tutmonda) and promoted by its founder Eugène Lanti, anationalism is not espoused by that organization as its official ideology.

History

Precursors 

Anationalistic ideas appeared in embryonic form in the plan for an "International Esperantist Workers' Federation" put forth by the Bohemian Esperantist Workers' Federation before World War I. These ideas, having gained impetus as a result of the war, were central to the thinking of the founders of SAT in 1921. They are very apparent in Lanti's work For la Neŭtralismon! ("Away with Neutralism!"), which first appeared under the pseudonym "Sennaciulo" ("Nationless Man").

The first members of SAT often regarded anationalism as a kind of all-embracing overall ideology of SAT, and liked to call themselves "sennaciuloj" ("nationless people"). Nevertheless, prior to the publication of Lanti's Manifesto de la Sennaciistoj ("Manifesto of the Anationalists") "anationalism" was a term that was applied to several rather diverse ideas. For many members of SAT who espoused anationalism at that time, it simply meant "(proletarian) internationalism plus Esperanto" or it signified a workers' version of L.L. Zamenhof's homaranismo.

A comparison of ABC de Sennaciismo written by Elsudo (Kolchinski) and published by SAT, with the Manifesto de la Sennaciistoj ("Manifesto of the Anationalists") shows how large a gap existed between various concepts of anationalism. Elsudo clearly defines SAT in his work as a "movement for anationalism". Ernst Drezen at the time of the schism in the workers' Esperanto movement of the 1930s, reproached SAT not so much for its "anationalism", something the communists within SAT had previously advocated as they understood it, but for its "Lanti-brand anationalism".

Little by little, a concept of anationalism was formulated in articles by Lanti in the organs of SAT.

A more stringent formulation 

In 1928, Lanti published a brochure, La Laborista Esperantismo ("Worker Esperantism"), in which he devoted an entire chapter to the definition of the new term. The anationalist tendency had previously encountered no opposition in the non-partisan organization. But in 1929 SAT entered a crisis, and anationalism became the main argument used by the opposition to attack the organization's leadership.

That opposition claimed that anationalism was pro-imperialist and, as such, "counterrevolutionary". The sudden and unexpected attack moved Lanti to publish anonymously in 1931 a brochure in 3000 copies: Manifesto de la Sennaciistoj, which was later translated into several languages, including a French version that appeared in 2000 copies.

Anationalism was defined as follows in that manifesto: "What characterizes anationalism is not primarily its acknowledgement of the huge role played by production of artifacts in the world. It is that capability that has made man the king of other living beings. Human beings adapt nature to their own needs, while animals must adapt to nature. Anationalists therefore do not deny the great strength that lies in the human will. They do not doubt that humans cannot shed their own weight or jump away from their own shadow. Nevertheless, the limited space in which man is free to act is relatively large. His will can thus engender great works. We therefore believe that the fateful laws of history are only relative."

The following quotation from the same work, which provides for a more precise understanding of the new doctrine, was denounced in its time by Stalinist internationalists for clearly contradicting the then prevailing theory of "construction of socialism in one country": "The anationalists combat all that is national: national languages and cultures, national customs and traditions. For them, Esperanto is their primary language and they consider national languages to be merely auxiliary. They refuse to participate in any national struggle and they acknowledge as necessary and advantageous to the exploited class only class struggle that seeks to eliminate classes, nationalities and all forms of exploitation." (ibid.)

As the heretical doctrine that was so expressed met up with opposition in SAT, the anationalists coalesced to form a faction independent of the organization, which they continued to support fervently. They began to publish the Sennaciista Bulteno ("Anationalist Bulletin") on a fairly regular basis.

Anarchism as a political movement was very supportive during this time of anationalism as well as of the Esperanto language. After the Spanish Civil War, Francoist Spain persecuted anarchists and Catalan nationalists, among whom the use of Esperanto was extensive.

After the death of Lanti 

After Lanti's death in 1947 and the post-war reconstitution of SAT, the anationalists revived their SAT faction in 1948 under the chairmanship of R. Roberts. Anationalists in SAT initiated and funded two reeditions of the Manifesto de la Sennaciistoj (1951 and 1971) and several other of Lanti's writings on anationalism.

In 1978, the SAT congress in Lectoure passed a resolution over the objections of the anationalists, which declared, among other things: "The preservation of ethnic language and culture is linked to the struggle for a new social order, and, as such, is part of the general efforts on the part of SAT's members to achieve justice and individual liberty."

During the 80's, while T. Burnell was the secretary of the Anationalist Faction, a Declaration on Anationalism was passed, which emphasized the struggle of the anationalists against nationalism and in favor of a general individual right to self-determination including the individual right to define one's own identity as an exercise of free will. The faction remained active, with the exception of periods of inactivity during the 80's and 90's, during which the debate over anationalism continued unabated in Sennaciulo, the monthly organ of SAT.

Today 

At the 2001 Sennacieca Asocio Tutmonda (SAT) congress in Nagykanizsa (Hungary), the Anationalist Faction of SAT was reestablished as a result of renewed interest in anationalism and related subjects, which had evidenced itself previously, when an "anationalism" internet mailing list was founded. During that meeting another Declaration on Anationalism was passed, which was a revised version of the previous declaration.

The presently active anationalists in the Anationalist Faction cultivate and develop the universalistic and (radical) antinationalist currents of thought that were characteristic of previous formulations of anationalism. Their orientation is less strictly Lantian than that of previous generations of anationalists, and they do not seek to achieve doctrinal uniformity. Some members of the Faction work to oppose ideologies that have become very influential within the general Esperanto movement in the past decades: ethnism, the instrumentalization of Esperanto in favor of various sorts of identity politics, differentialism (ethnopluralism) and language nationalism and purism (so-called "language defence").

Outside of SAT and the Anationalist Faction there are also a number of Esperantists that adhere in various degrees to anationalist ideas. Anationalism has generally not been propagated outside the Esperanto-speaking community. Lanti justified this in Chapter 5 of La Laborista Esperantismo with the statement that "disseminating anationalism among those who differ by language would be as foolish as teaching literature to illiterates". This view, however, has been modified at times, as national language translations of the Manifesto de la Sennaciistoj were published out of the conviction that this would help to popularize Esperanto. The Manifesto, moreover, concludes with a direct appeal to non-speakers of Esperanto: "The anationalists call upon the workers of the whole world: Learn Esperanto! Esperantists denationalize yourselves!"

See also
 National indifference
 Global citizenship

References

External links
Anationalist faction of SAT
Anationalism, Cosmopolitanism, Antinationalism
Manifesto of Non-Nationalists (excerpts) by E. Lanti
The Anationalist Eugène Lanti by Toño del Barrio

Anti-nationalism
Esperanto culture
Political terminology
World government
Anarchist theory
Cosmopolitanism
Internationalism
National identity